Wang Guangfa (born 1964) is a Chinese physician.

Career
Wang entered Beijing Medical University in 1981, majoring in medical, where he graduated in 1987 and earned a bachelor's degree. Between 1995 and 1996 he was studied in Jichi Medical University, majoring in respiratory medicine. Later, he earned a master's degree in Peking University in 2001, and doctor's degree in 2006.

During SARS Outbreak, he served as the chief examiner and expert group leader of SARS at Peking University First Hospital, responsible for SARS treatment of the hospital.

In January 2020, a "unknown cause pneumonia" (later known as COVID-19) outbreak in Wuhan. Wang was part of National Health Commission's expert group and visited Wuhan. On 10 January, Wang told China Central Television (CCTV) that "There was uncertainty regarding the human-to-human transmission" and the outbreak was "preventable and controllable". However, he was infected by COVID-19 and  hospitalized on 21 January. On 30 January, he recovered and discharged from the hospital.

References

External links

1964 births
Living people
Peking University alumni
Chinese pulmonologists
Chinese intensivists
COVID-19 researchers